Put Your Arms Around Me may refer to:

"Put Your Arms Around Me" (Natural song)
"Put Your Arms Around Me" (Texas song)
"Put Your Arms Around Me" (Natasha Bedingfield song) 
 "Put Your Arms Around Me Honey" - by Junie McCree / Albert Von Tilzer from the Broadway production of "Madame Sherry" (1910)